Shara is a female given name and may refer to:

 Shara L. Aranoff, Chair of the U.S. International Trade Commission from 2005 to 2014
 Shara Gillow (born 1987), Australian cyclist
 Shara Hughes (born 1981), American painter 
 Shara Lessley, American poet and essayist
 Shara Lin (born 1985), Taiwanese singer/songwriter/musician.
 Shara McCallum, Jamaican-American poet
 Shara Nelson (born 1965), British singer and songwriter
 Shara Nova (previously Worden; born 1974), lead singer and songwriter for US Indie rock band My Brightest Diamond
 Shara Proctor (born 1988), Anguillan-born long jumper, competing for Great Britain since 2011
 Shara Venegas (born 1992), Puerto Rican female volleyball player

 Shara Gampe (born 1981), Australian author

See also

Sharla

Feminine given names